Route 346, also known as Toogood Arm, is a highway in the province of Newfoundland and Labrador, Canada and leads from Route 340 (Road to the Isles) near Newville to Toogood Arm, all on New World Island.

Route description

Route 346 begins near Newville at an intersection with Route 340 (Road to the Isles) and it heads northeast through wooded and hilly terrain for several kilometres to pass through Cobb's Arm, where it has an intersection with a local road leading to Roger's Cove. The highway now curves to the northwest to meet a local road leading to Pike's Arm and Green Cove before entering Toogood Arm and coming to an end at a Cul-de-sac.

Major intersections

See also 

 List of Newfoundland and Labrador highways

References 

346